Gorham Township is one of the twelve townships of Fulton County, Ohio, United States.  The 2010 census found 2,260 people in the township, 977 of whom lived in the unincorporated portions of the township.

Geography
Located in the northwestern corner of the county along the Michigan line, it borders the following townships:
Medina Township, Lenawee County, Michigan - north
Seneca Township, Lenawee County, Michigan - northeast
Chesterfield Township - east
Dover Township - southeast corner
Franklin Township - south
Mill Creek Township, Williams County - west
Wright Township, Hillsdale County, Michigan - northwest

The village of Fayette is located in central Gorham Township.

Name and history
It is the only Gorham Township statewide.

Government
The township is governed by a three-member board of trustees, who are elected in November of odd-numbered years to a four-year term beginning on the following January 1. Two are elected in the year after the presidential election and one is elected in the year before it. There is also an elected township fiscal officer, who serves a four-year term beginning on April 1 of the year after the election, which is held in November of the year before the presidential election. Vacancies in the fiscal officership or on the board of trustees are filled by the remaining trustees.

Attractions

Harrison Lake State Park is a popular destination.

Public services

Public Schools

Students from the township are served by the following public local school district:
 
 Fayette Local School District

Mail

Mail is delivered in the township by the following U.S. Post Office locations:

 Fayette, Ohio 43521
 West Unity, Ohio 43570

Telephone

Most of the township lies within the Fayette telephone exchange, which is served by Frontier North, with telephone numbers using the following Numbering Plan Codes:

 419-237
 419-500
 567-404

An eastern portion of the township is part of the Chesterfield telephone exchange, which is served by Windstream Ohio, with telephone numbers using the following code:

 419-452

A small southeastern area is served by the Wauseon exchange, which is provided by UTO (United Telephone Company of Ohio,) doing business as CenturyLink, with the following codes:

 419-330
 419-335
 419-337
 419-388
 419-404
 419-583
 419-590

Electric

Toledo Edison and Midwest Energy Cooperative serves the township with electricity.

Highways

References

External links
County website

Townships in Fulton County, Ohio
Townships in Ohio